Hammarby IF Speedway is a Swedish motorcycle speedway team based in Stockholm, Sweden. The club has not been competing in the domestic leagues since 2016, after their home ground Gubbängens IP was demolished. Their biggest success was winning the bronze medal in Elitserien in 2007.

History
From the mid 1940s to 1969, the speedway club Monarkerna raced at Hammarby IP, a ground based in Södermalm, an area Hammarby IF considers its heartland. In the beginning of the 1990s, Getingarna, the last Stockholm-based club, was relegated from the first tier Elitserien.

In 2004, Hammarby IF Speedway was established, as a section under multi-sports club Hammarby IF. Gary Selan was the driving force behind the project and became the first team president. Racing at Gubbängens IP, in a suburban district in the southern part of Stockholm, the club went on to compete in the second tier Allsvenskan in their inaugural season. In 2005, Hammarby won the league in superior style and secured a promotion to Elitserien.

In 2006, Hammarby signed the previous World Champion Nicki Pedersen, who was the best rider in Elitserien in his debut season. The club's biggest success came in 2007, when they finished second in the table in the regular season before winning the bronze medal in the playoffs.

After a promising start to the 2008 Elitserien season, Hammarby dropped off in the table in the second half, and ultimately finished in eight place. At the end of the year, the club chose to withdraw from Elitserien due to financial difficulties. They competed in Allsvenskan in 2009 and 2010, before returning to Elitserien in 2011 with World Champion Tomasz Gollob as one of their drivers.

Hammarby competed in Elitserien for the last time in 2013, before getting relegated to Allsvenskan. The club was, however, expelled from the second division at the end of 2014 due to financial problems.

At the end of 2016, the club was effectively dissolved, after not being able to find a track to race on in the Stockholm area. After competing in Division 1, the domestic third tier, for several seasons, it had been announced that Hammarby's home ground Gubbängens IP would be demolished. At its peak, Hammarby drew regular attendances of some 2,000 people.

Season summary

Notabler riders
  (2004–2008, 2013)
  (2006–2007)
  (2007–2008)
  (2011–2013)

References

Swedish speedway teams
Hammarby IF
Sport in Stockholm